Miroj Abdulloyev (Mirojiddin Abdulloyev; born 15 August 1948) is the Chairman of the Communist Party of Tajikistan, who succeeded Acting chairman Mirzoazim Nasimov on 22 April 2017, following the removal of long serving party leader Shodi Shabdolov in 2016.

Biography

Miroj Abdulloyev was born in the village of Langar-kalon in the Muminobod district of Khatlon province on 15 August 1948. He graduated from the Pedagogical College in Kulob in 1966 and the Academy of the Interior Ministry of the Soviet Union in Moscow in 1984. From 1984 to 1991, he worked with the Tajik Interior Ministry's office for the Kulob region. From June 1999 to 2005, Abdulloyev headed the drug control agency's office for Khatlon province. From October 2016 to 11 March 2017, he was head of the CPT organization for the Kulob region in Khatlon province. On 11 March 2017, Miroj Abdulloyev was elected Secretary of the CPT Central Committee.

References

Communist Party of Tajikistan politicians
People from Khatlon Region
1948 births
Living people